Salvador Cañellas (born 1 December 1944) is a former Grand Prix motorcycle road racer and rally car racer from Spain.

Born in Santa Oliva, Catalonia, Spain, Cañellas had his best year in 1970 when he finished fourth in the 50cc world championship. He became the first Spanish rider to win a Grand Prix when he won the 1968 125cc Spanish Grand Prix. Cañellas won two motorcycle Grand Prix races during his career. He teamed up with Benjamin Grau on a Ducati to win the 1975 Montjuic 24-hour endurance race. He later switched successfully to auto racing (Rallye, Touring Cars and even single seaters) and won the 1972 Spanish Rally Championship. During the 1978 World Rally Championship season, he finished third in the Rally Poland.

References 

1944 births
Living people
People from Baix Penedès
Sportspeople from the Province of Tarragona
Spanish motorcycle racers
Motorcycle racers from Catalonia
50cc World Championship riders
125cc World Championship riders
Spanish rally drivers